UCDC can refer to:

 Dimitrie Cantemir Christian University
 Ulster Constitution Defence Committee
 University Child Development Center
 University of California-District of Columbia